Umida Abdullaeva (born 12 July 1997) is an Uzbekistani taekwondo practitioner. She won the silver medal in the women's 62 kg event at the 2017 Islamic Solidarity Games held in Baku, Azerbaijan.

She won the silver medal in the girls' +63kg event at the 2014 Summer Youth Olympics held in Nanjing, China. In the same year, she also represented Uzbekistan at the 2014 Asian Games in the women's 73 kg event. In this competition, she won her first match against Feruza Yergeshova of Kazakhstan and she was eliminated in her next match by Sorn Seavmey of Cambodia.

In 2017, she competed in the women's 62 kg event at the Asian Indoor and Martial Arts Games held in Ashgabat, Turkmenistan.

References

External links 
 

Living people
1997 births
Place of birth missing (living people)
Uzbekistani female taekwondo practitioners
Asian Games competitors for Uzbekistan
Taekwondo practitioners at the 2014 Asian Games
Taekwondo practitioners at the 2014 Summer Youth Olympics
Asian Taekwondo Championships medalists
Islamic Solidarity Games competitors for Uzbekistan
Islamic Solidarity Games medalists in taekwondo
21st-century Uzbekistani women